Blackthorn  is an Irish-American band formed in Pennsylvania in 1990. Their style of music has come to be called Celtic Rock for the fusion of Irish traditional instruments and music with modern rock. They have released five albums, starting with It's an Irish Thing in 1993 and most recently Push & Pull in 2006. Their repertoire consists of Traditional Irish songs and tunes as well as original Irish-rock compositions and Irish folk songs with a rock twist.

History
Mike and John Boyce are the son of Barney Boyce, an Irish immigrant from County Donegal and U.S. Army veteran. Drummer, Mike, Casba O’Callaghan was born in Tralee, Co. Kerry. Paul Moore, a founding member along with John McGroary, was the frontman for the band until 2005. Drummer, Mike, Casba, O’Callaghan born in Tralee, Co. Kerry, the only band member born in Ireland. Blackthorn  was formed in 1990 in the Philly area, with influences from the Clancy Brothers and the Dubliners. Their first album, "It's an Irish Thing", and the song Celtic Symphony became a hit in the Philadelphia area in 1994. The band added Seamus Kelleher on guitar in 1995. Their second album Here We Go Again featured more of a rock feel owing to Kelleher's influence. "The Other Side", their third album, got major airplay on the East Coast and was the first with entirely original compositions. Singer Mike Boyce, younger brother of John Boyce, joined in 1999.

In 2011, Seamus Kelleher left the band to pursue a solo career. He had been suffering from health problems ever since falling down a flight of stairs at a King of Prussia bar. Kelleher still makes guest appearances with the band on occasion. Rob Dunleavy replaced him on lead guitar. They were the headlining band at the 2012 Haverford Music Festival. Blackthorn has frequently played at the Rose Tree Park festival. They performed at the Inaugural Cheesesteak Fest in 2015.

Members

Current
Mike Boyce – bass, acoustic guitar, keyboards, whistles, and vocals
John McGroary (founding member) – accordion
John Boyce – keyboards, mandolin, and vocals
Mike O'Callaghan – drums,  percussion, vocals
Rob Dunleavy – guitar and vocals

Former
Seamus Kelleher – lead guitar
Paul Moore - guitar, lead vocals, founding member

Discography
 It's an Irish Thing (1994)
 Here We Go Again (1996)
 The Other Side (1998)
 Ratty Shoes (2001)
 Push & Pull (2006)

References

External links
Allmusic
Blackthorn - Dara Records
Cops: Teacher locks son in car at bar to watch band

1993 establishments in Pennsylvania
Celtic music groups
Musical groups established in 1993
Musical groups from Philadelphia